The Mimic Men is a novel by V. S. Naipaul, first published by Andre Deutsch in the UK in 1967.

Introduction
Not long after finishing A Flag on the Island, Naipaul began work on the novel The Mimic Men, though for almost a year he did not make significant progress.  At the end of this period, he was offered a Writer-in-Residence fellowship at Makerere University in Kampala, Uganda.  There, in early 1966, Naipaul began to rewrite his material, and went on to complete the novel quickly. The finished novel broke new ground for him.  Unlike his earlier fiction, it is not comic.  It does not unfold chronologically.  Its language is allusive and ironic, and its overall structure is whimsical.  It has strands of both fiction and non-fiction, a precursor of Naipaul's approach in later novels.  It is intermittently dense, even obscure, but it also has beautiful passages, especially in the descriptions of the fictional tropical island of Isabella.  The subject of sex appears explicitly for the first time in Naipaul's work.

Plot summary

The plot, to the extent that there is one, is centred on Ralph Singh, an Indo-Caribbean politician from Isabella who narrates in the first person. Singh is in exile in London and attempting to write his political memoirs.  Earlier, in the immediate aftermath of decolonisation in a number of British colonies in the late 1950s and early 1960s, Singh shared political power with a more powerful Afro-Caribbean politician. Soon the memoirs take on a more personal aspect. There are flashbacks to the formative and defining periods of Singh's life. In many of these, during crucial moments, whether during his childhood, his married life, or his political career, he appears to abandon engagement and enterprise. He rationalises later that these belong only to fully made societies.

Characters
 Ralph Ranjit Kripal Singh or Ralph Singh, the first-person narrator, born and raised on Isabella, to which he returns, after a brief stay in England, to start a career as a businessman and, later, as a politician
 Pa, later Gurudeva, Singh's father
 Nana, Singh's maternal grandfather and owner of the Bella Bella Bottling Company on Isabella; dies at the end of the Second World War, bequeathing a sugar cane estate to Ralph
 Cecil, Nana's son and Singh's mother's brother, not much older than Ralph
 Sally, Cecil's elder sister, with whom Singh has a fling
 Sandra, a student in London whom Ralph Singh later marries and with whom he moves to Isabella
 Browne, Singh's classmate at Isabella Imperial High School, later co-editor of The Socialist, partner in politics and Chief Minister of Isabella
 Deschampsneufs, an old French family on Isabella, originally slave-owning
 Champ Deschampsneufs, classmate of Singh at Isabella Imperial High School, and before that at Isabella Boys School
 Wendy Deschampsneufs, Champ's sister
 Roger Deschampsneufs, Champ's father
 Sir Hugh Clifford, former British Governor of Isabella, who instituted the Malaya Cup, a horse race; in real life Sir Hugh was Colonial Secretary of Trinidad from 1903 to 1912
 Tamango, the Deschampsneufs' entry in the horse race, later killed by someone, a suspected Hindu, perhaps even Singh's father, Gurudeva
 Major Grant, Latin master at Isabella Imperial
 Hok, another classmate of Singh, who dreams about his Chinese ancestry
 Eden, another classmate of Singh's at Isabella Imperial
 Dalip, son of Gurudeva's mistress
 Mr Shylock, owner of the boarding house in which Singh lives upon arriving in London soon after the end of the Second World War
 Lieni, the Maltese housekeeper in the boarding house 
 The Murals, who become Singh's landlords after he moves out of Mr Shylock's boarding house
 Mrs Ellis, the landlady at the time of Ralph Singh's engagement to Sandra.
 Lord Stockwell, British owner of estates on Isabella
 Lady Stella Stockwell, Stockwell's daughter, with whom Singh has a brief affair.

Reception
When The Mimic Men was published, it received generally positive critical notice.  In particular, Caribbean politicians such as Michael Manley and Eric Williams weighed in, the latter writing, "V. S. Naipaul's description of West Indians as 'mimic men' is harsh but true ..."

Notes

Works cited

Further reading

Editions

English
London: Andre Deutsch, 1967 [no ISBN].
New York: Macmillan, 1967 [no ISBN].
London: Readers Union, 1968 [no ISBN].
Harmondsworth: Penguin, 1969 [no ISBN].
New York: Vintage Books USA, 1985 .
Harmondsworth: Penguin, 1992 .
London: Picador, 2001 .
New York: Vintage International, 2001 .
reissue with a new preface by the author, London: Picador, 2011  . W

Other languages
Los Simuladores, translated by Jordi Beltran Ferrer, Madrid: Random House, 2009

External links

Novels by V. S. Naipaul
1967 British novels
Novels set in Trinidad and Tobago
André Deutsch books